Camp Stone is a Jewish summer camp located in Sugar Grove, Pennsylvania. It is affiliated with Bnei Akiva, a Religious Zionist youth movement. The camp encourages aliyah, or emigration to Israel.

History

The camp began operations in 1969, and is named after its founder, the Jewish philanthropist, Irving I. Stone, a longtime executive at American Greetings. Stone purchased the 400-acre site of a former camp to establish an Orthodox Jewish summer camp.

Programs

Programs for campers include study of Jewish history, Torah study and prayer. Other programs include an introduction to farming, glass blowing and blacksmithing. Traditional camp activities like swimming, horseback riding, archery, Color War, drama, rock skipping, 9 Square, sports such as basketball, football, soccer, ultimate frisbee, and other activities are also offered, as well as a ropes course. The camp also features a reproduction of a German cattle car, like those used to transport Jews to Nazi concentration camps, and used for Holocaust education. According to previous camp director Yehuda Rothner, the lesson taught is that "senseless hatred leads into the abyss".

References

Further reading
Alex Pomson, Where Consciousness Meets Community: Clues from Camp about Jewish Leadership, HaYidion, RAVSAK: The Jewish Community Day School Network, March 9, 2012

External links

Modern Orthodox Judaism in the United States
Orthodox Judaism in Pennsylvania
Religious Zionism
Buildings and structures in Warren County, Pennsylvania
Jewish organizations established in 1969
Stone
Zionism in the United States
Youth organizations based in Pennsylvania